In enzymology, a 16alpha-hydroxysteroid dehydrogenase is an enzyme that catalyzes the chemical reaction

a 16alpha-hydroxysteroid + NAD(P)+  a 16-oxosteroid + NAD(P)H + H+

The 3 substrates of this enzyme are 16alpha-hydroxysteroid, NAD+, and NADP+, whereas its 4 products are 16-oxosteroid, NADH, NADPH, and H+.

This enzyme belongs to the family of oxidoreductases, specifically those acting on the CH-OH group of donor with NAD+ or NADP+ as acceptor. The systematic name of this enzyme class is 16alpha-hydroxysteroid:NAD(P)+ 16-oxidoreductase. This enzyme is also called 16alpha-hydroxy steroid dehydrogenase.

References

 

EC 1.1.1
NADPH-dependent enzymes
NADH-dependent enzymes
Enzymes of unknown structure